Italy, Germany and Spain did not send teams to the 1939 Tour de France. The Tour organisation were short on participating cyclists, because of this. To solve the problem, they allowed Belgium to send two teams, and France to send four additional regional teams.

The French cyclists had been successful in the 1930s, but their Tour winners were absent in 1939:
1930 and 1932 winner André Leducq had retired in 1938, as had 1931 and 1934 winner Antonin Magne; 1933 winner Georges Speicher did not ride, and 1937 winner Roger Lapébie was injured. This all made the Belgian team favourite.

By team

By rider

By nationality

References

1939 Tour de France
1939